The Magic City Snowbears was a professional basketball club based in Minot, North Dakota that competed in the International Basketball Association beginning in the 1996-1997 season. The team was contracted when the IBA, IBL, and CBA merged for the 2001-2002 season. The team was managed by Minot, ND Mayor Curt Zimbelman.

Defunct basketball teams in the United States
Minot, North Dakota
Basketball teams in North Dakota
Basketball teams established in 1996
Sports clubs disestablished in 2001
1996 establishments in North Dakota
2001 disestablishments in North Dakota